The House of Angostura, also known as Angostura Limited, is a Trinidad and Tobago company famous for the production of Angostura bitters, invented by the company's founder.  The company is also a distiller and is the major producer of rum in Trinidad and Tobago.  The company also has been used as a vehicle for international expansion by its parent company, CL Financial.  As a result of these acquisitions, the company owns distillers in the United States, Canada, The Bahamas and Suriname.

History 
The company was founded around 1830 in the Venezuelan town of Angostura (now Ciudad Bolívar) by a German doctor, Johann Gottlieb Benjamin Siegert, Surgeon-General in Simon Bolivar's army in Venezuela. Around 1820, he had tried to find a medicine to improve appetite and digestive well-being of the soldiers.

In 1830, Siegert exported his unique aromatic bitters to England and Trinidad. By 1850, he had resigned his commission in the Venezuelan army to concentrate on the manufacture of his bitters, since by then, demand had leapt ahead of supply. In 1862, the product was exhibited and sampled in London, to great approval.  Upon his death in 1870, Siegert left the care of the company to his younger brother and son, who subsequently moved it to Port of Spain, Trinidad six years later in 1876.

Over the course of time, Angostura bitters and Dr. Siegert's company alone became purveyor to the King of Prussia, Spain, and King George V. Today, angostura bitters are also produced by various other vendors, some of which add the bark of the angostura tree (Angostura trifoliata). Angostura bitters are a key ingredient in many cocktails, for example in pink gin and the Manhattan. Angostura brand bitters do not contain any angostura bark. There are several other companies that make bitters containing this bark, notably Fee Brothers and Riemerschmid.

The word "Angostura" (lit. "Narrows") is the founding name of Ciudad Bolívar along the narrows of Venezuela's Orinoco River where Dr. Siegert was based.  It was an important trading town with river access to the sea.

In December 2016, questions arose regarding the integrity of Angostura rum, with CEO Robert Wong sent on administrative leave for two months. Reports say Angostura breached EU rules of origin laws by purchasing bulk rum and repackaging it, without making any substantial changes.

Products

 Forres Park Puncheon Rum: An over-proof rum originally developed for the exclusive use of the Fernandes family and their estate workers.
 White Oak: A white rum aged in American white oak barrels. Sold within the Caribbean and the top selling rum in Trinidad and Tobago.
 Fernandes Black Label: A golden rum that was originally produced by Fernandes Distillers.
 Single Barrel Reserve: A blend of rums aged in single select bourbon oak casks for a minimum of five years.
 Angostura Reserva: A white rum sold internationally that is aged for a minimum of three years before being filtered.
 Angostura 5 Year Old: A golden rum that is available internationally aged for a minimum of five years.
 Angostura 7 Year Old: A dark rum that is available internationally and aged for a minimum of seven years.
 1919: A specially blended multiple award-winning rum, named for the year that it was originally blended.
 1824: A premium Rum aged for a minimum of 12 years from casks specially selected by the master-blender. The name of this rum commemorates the year that Dr. Siegert develops Angostura aromatic bitters. 
 1787: A super-premium 15 year-old aged rum launched in 2016. 1787 marks the beginning of sugar production in Trinidad.
 Angostura No. 1 Premium Rum Cask Collection Batch: No. 1 is the first premium rum to be unveiled in The Cask Collection, a new limited-edition range dedicated to rums aged in special French bourbon casks. Aged 16 years. Only 15,030 bottles are available worldwide.
 Angostura No. 1: No. 1 is the first premium rum to be unveiled in The Cask Collection, a new limited-edition range dedicated to rums aged in special casks. Only 9,600 bottles are available worldwide.
 Legacy: A special blend of seven of the brand’s most rare and precious rums. Only 20 bottles have been produced and until 2014, this was the most expensive rum in the world.

References

External links

 

1830 establishments in Venezuela
Bitters
Brands of Trinidad and Tobago
British Royal Warrant holders
Drink companies of Trinidad and Tobago
Rums
Food and drink companies established in 1830